Schönau im Schwarzwald is a town in the district of Lörrach in Baden-Württemberg, Germany.

Mayors 
 1945–1946: Albert Gutmann
 1946–1956: Karl Zimmermann
 1957–1977: Ludwig Morath (FWV)
 1977–1993: Richard Böhler (CDU)
 1993–2012: Bernhard Seger (CDU)
 since 2012: Peter Schelshorn (CDU)

Notable people from Schönau 

 Fridolin Dietsche (1861-1908), sculptor
 Karl Geiler (1878-1953), legal scientist and politician
 Albert Leo Schlageter (1894-1923), German Freikorps fighter
 Joachim Löw (born 1960), German footballer and coach, from 1 August 2006 - 29 June 2021 Bundestrainer of the Germany national football team
 Markus Löw (born 1961), former footballer and today's coach

References

Lörrach (district)
Baden